Lake Arin (in Turkish: Arin Gölü; also Sodalı Göl) is a soda lake in Turkey. It is a part of Adilcevaz ilçe (district) of Bitlis Province. The lake is to the east of Adilcevaz and separated from Lake Van, the biggest lake of Turkey by alluvial deposits  of only  width.

Gadwall, red-crested pochard and ruddy duck are among the birds of the lake.

References

Arin
Landforms of Bitlis Province
Important Bird Areas of Turkey